Ann Comerford is a former camogie player, captain of the All Ireland Camogie Championship winning team in 1970. She won a second All Ireland senior medal in 1972.

Career
She scored two goals in the 1971 defeat of Wexford. Although injured she came on the 1971 All Ireland Club Championship semi-final for South Presentation Past Pupils.

References

External links
 Camogie.ie Official Camogie Association Website
 Wikipedia List of Camogie players

Cork camogie players
Living people
Year of birth missing (living people)